The tenth season of CSI: Crime Scene Investigation premiered on CBS on September 24, 2009, and ended May 20, 2010. The series stars Marg Helgenberger and Laurence Fishburne.

Plot
Riley Adams leaves the CSI team in turmoil, as Catherine's leadership skills are called into question ("Family Affair"), during the 10th season of CSI. The team, including the newly returned Sara Sidle, continue to investigate the gruesome, the premeditated, and the unusual, including the death of a porn producer ("Ghost Town"), a botched robbery ("Working Stiffs"), a cop-on-cop homicide ("Coup de Grace"), the murder of a football coach ("Blood Sport"), a bizarre revenge plot ("Death & The Maiden"), a death at a bowling tournament ("Lover's Lanes"), and a human trafficking case that leads Ray to both New York and Miami ("The Lost Girls"). Meanwhile, Nick, Greg, and Hodges celebrate Henry's birthday ("Appendicitement") as Catherine comes face to face with Rascal Flatts ("Unshockable"), and Langston begins to investigate a series of murders committed by Dr. Jekyll ("Sin City Blue"), which may lead to his own brutal end ("Meat Jekyll").

Cast

Changes
Lauren Lee Smith is no longer part of the regular cast. Liz Vassey and David Berman both become main cast members. Jorja Fox recurs.

Main cast

 Laurence Fishburne as Raymond Langston, a CSI Level 2
 Marg Helgenberger as Catherine Willows, a CSI Level 3 Supervisor
 George Eads as Nick Stokes, a CSI Level 3 Assistant Supervisor
 Eric Szmanda as Greg Sanders, a CSI Level 3
 Robert David Hall as Al Robbins, the Chief Medical Examiner
 Wallace Langham as David Hodges, a Trace Technician 
 Liz Vassey as Wendy Simms, a DNA Technician
 David Berman as David Phillips, an Assistant Medical Examiner
 Paul Guilfoyle as Jim Brass, a Homicide Detective Captain

Recurring cast

Guest cast
 Rascal Flatts as themselves

Episodes

See also
List of CSI: Crime Scene Investigation episodes

References

10
2009 American television seasons
2010 American television seasons